2022 YG is a near-Earth asteroid and a potential quasi-satellite of Earth, discovered by amateur astronomer Gennadiy Borisov at Nauchnyi, Crimea on 15 December 2022. It has an estimated diameter of 16–30 meters, given H of 26.6, and an albedo 4-15%.

Notes

References

External links 
 New Quasi-satellite 2022 YG – Animation of 2022 YG's orbit in a rotating reference frame with respect to Earth from 1900–2207, YouTube, 17 December 2022
 
 
 

Minor planet object articles (unnumbered)

20221215
20221215